Kosovo competed at the 2015 World Aquatics Championships in Kazan, Russia from 24 July to 9 August 2015. This will be Kosovo's first participation at the World Championships since gaining membership by FINA in February 2015.

Swimming

Kosovar swimmers have achieved qualifying standards in the following events (up to a maximum of 2 swimmers in each event at the A-standard entry time, and 1 at the B-standard):

Men

Women

References

External links
Kazan 2015 web site

Nations at the 2015 World Aquatics Championships
2015 in Kosovan sport
Kosovo at the World Aquatics Championships